The Gspaltenhorn is a mountain of the Bernese Alps, located between the valleys of Kiental and Lauterbrunnen in the canton of Bern. With an elevation of 3,436 metres above sea level, the Gspaltenhorn is the highest summit of the range lying north-east of the Gamchilück pass (2,837 m).

References

External links

Gspaltenhorn on Hikr
Gspaltenhorn on Summitpost

Bernese Alps
Mountains of the Alps
Alpine three-thousanders
Mountains of Switzerland
Mountains of the canton of Bern